Homecoming is the second studio album by America, released on November 15, 1972 through Warner Bros. Records. Acoustic guitar-based, with a more pronounced electric guitar and keyboard section than their first album, their second effort helped continue the band's success, and includes one of their best known hits, "Ventura Highway."

Homecoming peaked at number 9 on Billboards Pop Albums Chart and was certified platinum by the RIAA. It produced three hit singles: "Ventura Highway", which peaked at number 8 on the Billboard singles chart and number 3 on the adult contemporary chart; "Don't Cross the River", which hit number 35 on Billboard and 23 on the AC chart; and "Only in Your Heart" peaked at number 62 on Billboard's Pop singles chart. Several other songs received radio airplay on FM stations playing album tracks, including "To Each His Own", "California Revisited", and "Cornwall Blank".

For this album and the next six throughout the next five years, the group traditionally chose titles beginning with the letter "H" (the self-titled debut album became unofficially included in this distinction when fans started referring to it as the "Horse with No Name" album when that track was added to later pressings).

Reception

In his AllMusic review music critic David Cleary called Homecoming "America's finest album" and despite citing sometimes banal lyrics, wrote that "each song here has something to recommend it. This top-flight album is a very rewarding listen."

Track listing

Personnel
America
Dan Peek – guitar, keyboards, vocals
Gerry Beckley – guitar, keyboards, vocals, bass guitar on "Till the Sun Comes Up Again" and "Head and Heart"
Dewey Bunnell – guitar, vocals, percussion on "Head & Heart"
with:
Joe Osborn – bass guitar
Hal Blaine – drums, percussion
Gary Mallaber – drums and percussion on "Till the Sun Comes Up Again"
Technical
Gary Burden – art direction, design
Henry Diltz – photography, banjo on "Don't Cross the River"
Bill Halverson – engineer
Lee Herschberg – mastering
Chuck Leary – engineering assistance
Mike D. Stone of the Record Plant – engineering
Yoshiro Nagato - liner notes

Charts

Certifications

References

1972 albums
America (band) albums
Warner Records albums